Susana Baron Supervielle de Tresca (1910–17th May 2004) was an Argentine composer.

Born in Buenos Aires, Supervielle began her musical education under Gilardo Gilardi and Juan Carlos Paz. In 1945, interested in the avant-garde concrete music that Pierre Schaeffer was experimenting with in Paris, she moved there and joined the newly formed Groupe de Recherche de Musique Concrète at his direction. At the same time, she studied with Nadia Boulanger and later, in São Paulo, with Hans-Joachim Koellreutter. She authored several works for piano and instrumental chamber ensembles, but is best known for her vocal pieces with piano accompaniment, with some sixty compositions.
 

She married Jorge Tresca and settled in Brazil where she continued her studies in musicology and composition, where she died at the age of 94.

References

1910 births
2004 deaths
Argentine classical composers
Women classical composers
Argentine expatriates in Brazil
20th-century Argentine musicians
20th-century classical composers
Musicians from Buenos Aires
20th-century women composers
Argentine women composers